FVS may refer to:
 Falcon Aviation Services, an Emirati airline
 Finland Station, in St. Petersburg, Russia
 Forest Vegetation Simulator
 Fountain Valley School of Colorado, in the United States
 Fujitsu V8 Supercars Series
 Victoria Street railway station, Perth, in Western Australia

See also 
 FV (disambiguation)